Cox House is a building in Franklin, Tennessee that was listed on the National Register of Historic Places in 1980.  It is also known as the Harpeth Academy building.

It was built in 1891 for Congressman Nicholas Nichol Cox. It was extended in 1972 and again in 1975. It was designed by architects Woods & Crabb. It includes Late Victorian architecture.

It was purchased in 1969 by the Harpeth Academy, a private elementary school that itself is a historic institution, to be used as an administration building.  It is now part of Battle Ground Academy.

See also
Owen-Cox House, also NRHP-listed in Williamson County

References

Houses on the National Register of Historic Places in Tennessee
Houses in Franklin, Tennessee
Houses completed in 1891
National Register of Historic Places in Williamson County, Tennessee